Miss Venezuela 1979 was the 26th edition of Miss Venezuela pageant held at Caracas Hilton Hotel in Caracas, Venezuela, on May 17, 1979, after weeks of events.  The winner of the pageant was Maritza Sayalero, Miss Departamento Vargas.

The pageant was broadcast on Venevision from the Caracas Hilton Hotel in Caracas, Venezuela and was the first Miss Venezuela broadcast in color. At the conclusion of the final night of competition, outgoing titleholder Marisol Alfonzo, crowned Maritza Sayalero of Departamento Vargas as the new Miss Venezuela.

Results
Miss Venezuela 1979 - Maritza Sayalero (Miss Departamento Vargas)

The runners-up were:
1st runner-up - Tatiana Capote (Miss Barinas)
2nd runner-up - Maria Fernanda Ramírez (Miss Distrito Federal)(disqualified) 
3rd runner-up - Nina Kors (Miss Portuguesa)
4th runner-up - Nilza Moronta (Miss Zulia)

Special awards
 Miss Photogenic (voted by press reporters) - Marisol Fernández (Miss Mérida)
 Miss Congeniality - Francia Pena (Miss Falcón)
 Miss Friendship - Nilza Moronta (Miss Zulia)

Delegates
The Miss Venezuela 1979 delegates are:

 Miss Amazonas - Lucía Coromoto Martínez
 Miss Aragua - Marisela Buitrago Mora
 Miss Barinas - Tatiana Capote Abdel
 Miss Bolívar - Ayurami Margarita Estévez Ramírez
 Miss Carabobo - Carolina Kock Tovar
 Miss Departamento Vargas - Maritza Sayalero Fernández
 Miss Distrito Federal - Diana Maria Fernanda Ramírez (disqualified)
 Miss Falcón - Francia Venezuela Pena Toledo
 Miss Guárico - Doris Coromoto Rivero Jiménez
 Miss Mérida - Marisol Fernández Biñé
 Miss Miranda - Alida Elizabeth Bello Hernández
 Miss Nueva Esparta - Nydia Elizabeth Centeno Contreras
 Miss Portuguesa - Nina Korschunov Kondryn
 Miss Sucre - Diana Elizabeth Stanford Rodríguez
 Miss Trujillo - Jeannette Josefina Rodríguez Delgado
 Miss Zulia -  Nirza Josefina -Nilza- Moronta Sangronis

External links
Miss Venezuela official website

1979 beauty pageants
1979 in Venezuela